I Know What You Did Last Summer is an American horror film franchise consisting of three slasher films and one television series, loosely based on the novel of the same name by Lois Duncan. The first installment was written by Kevin Williamson, directed by Jim Gillespie, and released in 1997.

The first two installments star Jennifer Love Hewitt, Freddie Prinze Jr. and Muse Watson. In addition, the supporting cast includes: Sarah Michelle Gellar, Ryan Phillippe and Johnny Galecki in the first film, with Brandy, Mekhi Phifer and Matthew Settle in the second film.

Novel

In 1973, Lois Duncan's I Know What You Did Last Summer was published. It was republished as a tie-in to the film in 1997 and once again in 2018 with some of its content modernized. The film adaptation reenvisioned the story of the novel as a violent slasher film, as opposed to the slow-burn mystery nature of the novel.

Films

I Know What You Did Last Summer (1997)

After an accident on a winding road, four teens make the fatal mistake of dumping their victim's body into the sea. But exactly one year later, a mysterious fisherman begins stalking the friends.

I Still Know What You Did Last Summer (1998)

The murderous fisherman with a hook stalks the two surviving teens, Julie James and Ray Bronson who left him for dead. Despite Julie's warnings, her friends do not believe her until it is too late, and the fisherman begins a second murder spree at a posh island resort in the Bahamas.

I'll Always Know What You Did Last Summer (2006)

A group of teenagers in Colorado find themselves being stalked and killed one by one by a mysterious figure with a hook, exactly one year after they covered up a friend's accidental death.

Untitled fourth film
In September 2014, Sony Pictures revealed plans to remake the film, with Mike Flanagan and Jeff Howard writing the script. The film was a high priority and was initially set for release in 2016. Further, the new direction and scope of the film would need an estimated budget of $15–20 million. Flanagan confirmed that this new iteration of the franchise would not include elements of the 1973 novel nor of the 1997 feature film. However, the project was canceled.

In February 2023, it was announced that a legacy sequel was in development with Jennifer Love Hewitt and Freddie Prinze Jr. in negotiations to reprise their respective roles. Jennifer Kaytin Robinson will direct the film from a script written by Leah McKendrick, based on an idea by Robinson and McKendrick. Neal H. Moritz will serve as producer. The plot is said to be similar in approach to Scream (2022), in which characters from the original film are included in a story featuring a younger cast.

Television

I Know What You Did Last Summer (2021)

Amazon Studios acquired the rights in July 2019 to develop a television series adaptation with Neal H. Moritz and James Wan producing. Craig Macneill directed the pilot episode, written by Sara Goodman. Madison Iseman, Brianne Tju, Ezekiel Goodman, Ashley Moore, Sebastian Amoruso, Fiona Rene, Cassie Beck, Brooke Bloom, and Bill Heck star in the series. It was released on October 15, 2021.

Principal cast

Additional crew and production details

Reception

Box office performance

Critical and public response

Music

Novelization
In 1998, a paperback release of the screenplay for I Still Know What You Did Last Summer was published by Pocket Books.

References

Horror film franchises
Film series introduced in 1997
I Know What You Did Last Summer
Columbia Pictures franchises
Trilogies